Tofu skin, Yuba, beancurd skin, beancurd sheet, or beancurd robes is a food product made from soybeans. During the boiling of soy milk, in an open shallow pan, a film or skin composed primarily of a soy protein-lipid complex forms on the liquid surface. The films are collected and dried into yellowish sheets known as tofu skin. Since tofu skin is not produced using a coagulant, it is not technically a proper tofu; however, it does have similar texture and flavor to some tofu products.

Tofu skin's use was first documented in written records in China, Korea, and Japan in the sixteenth century. It is widely used, fresh, fermented, or dried, in Chinese, Korean, and Japanese cuisine.

Early history
An early written reference to tofu skin appeared in 1587 in Japan in the Matsuya Hisamatsu chakai-ki [Three-generation diary of the Matsuya's family's tea ceremonies]. The writer, Matsuya Hisamasa, states simply that tofu skin is the film that forms atop soymilk.

Other written references to tofu skin appeared around that time in China in the Bencao Gangmu [The great pharmacopoeia] by Li Shizhen. This work was completed in 1578, but not published until 1596. Chapter 25 states:

A third known reference to tofu skin appears in 1695 in Japan in the Ben Zhao Shi Jian (Wade–Giles: Pen Chao Shih Chien [A Mirror of Food in This Dynasty, 12 volumes]. This book was written by Hitomi Hitsudai in Japan, in Chinese. When Japanese read the Chinese characters for tofu skin, doufu-lao, they pronounce them tōfu no uba. Lao or uba means "old woman" or "wet nurse".

Preparation

Tofu skin may be purchased in fresh or dried form. In the latter case, the tofu skin is rehydrated in water before use. It is often used to wrap dim sum.

Because of its slightly rubbery texture, tofu skin is also manufactured in bunched, folded and wrapped forms that are used as meat substitutes in vegetarian cuisine. Tofu skins can be wrapped and then folded against itself to make dòu baō. These are often fried to give it a firmer skin before being cooked further.

Forms

Fresh
These are the three basic forms. Each comes in many varieties.

Dried
Tofu skin may also be dried and sold as dried beancurd sticks. By layering or bunching fresh tofu skin or rehydrated tofu skin, then tying it tightly in cloth and stewing it, the dried beancurd sticks will retain their original shape. This bunched tofu skin is then called tofu chicken (or ).  In Thai cooking it is referred to as fawng dtâo-hûu (lit. foam tofu). It is commonly called Foo Chuk in Southeast Asia

Meat alternatives
By layering and bunching the sheets in a certain manner, an imitation of chicken breast  can be created with tofu skin. The effect is completed by frying the "skin" side of the tofu chicken until it is crispy. If stuffed with vegetables, it becomes tofu duck. Likewise various other meat alternatives have been made in this way, especially by Buddhist vegetarian restaurants in areas of Chinese culture.

The earliest process for making these meatless meats consisted of rolling thin sheets of doufupi, literally tofu skin, around a filling of minced, smoked, or other seasoned pieces of tofu skin, tying closed the bundle with string, and steaming until a meaty texture and flavor developed.

Log
Other methods include rolling the tofu skin tightly on a chopstick and steaming the tofu skin to form a log. When the log is sliced, each slice will be circular in form with a square hole in the center, which looks like old Chinese coins.

Gallery

See also

 Tofu skin roll
 Bai ye
 Dim sum
 Abura-age

Notes

External links
About Tofu Skin

Buddhist cuisine
Cantonese cuisine
Chinese cuisine
Dim sum
Japanese cuisine
Soy-based foods
Sushi
Skin